Pilibhit district is one of the 75 districts in the state of Uttar Pradesh in India, and Pilibhit city is the district headquarters. Pilibhit district is a part of Bareilly Division. A Tiger Reserve Area was named Pilibhit Tiger Reserve in September 2008.

History
Pilibhit district had its origins as a subdivision of Bareilly district in 1871, consisting of the parganas of Jahanabad, Pilibhit, and Puranpur, with a magistrate based in Pilibhit. It was then officially upgraded to a separate district in November 1879.

The early history of Pilibhit district is obscure. This area is traditionally considered to have formed part of the Panchala kingdom, whose capital was at Ahichchhatra, although there are no historical documents to confirm this. On the other hand, the many ruin sites in the district indicate that there was extensive settlement here, and that the forests which historically covered the area used to be smaller.

Archaeological sites
At Neoria Husainpur is a large area of ruins that became covered by dense forest. Mahof has a large ruined brick fort; Simaria Ghosu, not far away, has a mud fort, but it appears to have been built later than other ruins in the area. Several octagonal wells and a large masonry tank at Khaj appear to be the remains of a large town. Perhaps the most important ruins in the district are at Balai Khera, close to the town of Jahanabad. Nearby to the west is a mound called Parasua-kot, which is from the same time as Balai Khera.

There are many ruins in the forests of Puranpur tehsil, often marked by "unusually large bricks, often carved and chiselled in a most artistic manner." The ruins at Dhanaura have been partly washed away by the Chauka, but there are still several large ruin-covered mounds here, over a large area. Another site is at Suapara, a short distance north of Puranpur. The massive fortress at Shahgarh appears to have been occupied during a fairly late period, since coins of the Varmmas of Nepal have been found inside its walls. Further south is a large unnamed site where fragments of pottery, bricks, and glazed tiles have been found.

In the Bisalpur tehsil, there are extensive ruins at Marauri, on the Khanaut, and at Barkhera in the north there is a large mound that is traditionally said to mark the spot of a city built by the legendary Raja Vena.

Dewal inscription
The 10th-century Dewal inscription, which was found in 1829 at Allahabad Dewal, near Deoria. It is a Sanskrit inscription, dated to year 1049 of the Vikram Samvat (992 or 993 CE) and written in the so-called kutila or "crooked" script. The entire inscription is written as a 37-stanza poem, full of metaphors and mythological allusions, and documenting the construction of two temples to Shiva and Parvati by a local ruler and his wife. It was composed by a man named Nahila, son of Sivarudra, who was evidently well-versed in Sanskrit grammar and rhetoric.

The ruler mentioned in the inscription, Lalla of the Chhinda family, is described as a mandala-putra, or ruler of a province, and he was probably a feudatory of the kings of Kannauj. The text says that he "brought the river Katha to his capital", which according to H.R. Nevill probably refers to the digging of the canal now called the Katni. It also says that Lalla had the two temples built and endowed them with a quarter of the revenue from several villages. He gave the site the name "Devapalli", which is probably the same as "Dewal".  The site of Garha Khera, a large 800-square-foot mound with two small tanks, was probably Lalla's capital; the Katni winds its way around this site. Atop a large mound on the south side of Allahabad Dewal are the remains of a large temple, which is where the Dewal inscription was found.

Medieval through Early Modern
Whatever happened in the area after the time of the Dewal inscription is unknown. It is completely absent from contemporary sources for several centuries. The Muslim conquerors appear to have had no interest in the region, which may have been densely forested around this time. The first reference to Pilibhit is possibly in 1256, when the Delhi Sultan Nasir-ud-Din Muhammad led troops to Awadh by way of "Tilibhat". Pilibhit may also be the "Talpat" mentioned during the reign of Sultan Ghiyas-ud-Din Balban.

The Katehria Rajputs came to rule over the Pilibhit area at some point. Tradition holds that their leader Kharag Singh conquered the western part of this district from the local tribes. From this base, the Katehrias were only nominally subjects of the Sultans of Delhi. In 1379, after Kharag Singh murdered the governor of Budaun, Firoz Shah led a scorched-earth campaign in the region, causing widespread destruction and resulting in the entire area between Budaun and Bilaspur becoming a hunting ground.

During Akbar's reign, the area of today's Pilibhit district was a remote backwater. In the Ain-i-Akbari, the area included the parganas of Balai and Punar, and Bareilly, with a small part possibly belonging to Gola in today's Shahjahanpur district. Balai was based at what is now called Balai Khera, and Punar was the old name of Puranpur. These parganas were all nominally part of the sarkar of Budaun, but in practice they were under the governors of Bareilly. During this period, Pilibhit district's history is essentially the same as Bareilly district's, with nothing to set it apart.

Modern times
During the freedom struggle, the rural folks showed Bravery. One freedom fighter Shri Bhadain Lal, Vill Rampur Amrit near Bilsanda who killed a British Police Inspector. He was jailed & imprisoned at Lalitpur Central Jail. The Britishers during the freedom struggle were chased out. They were given shelter by a few villagers at Mankapur. The Britishers in return offered them Land & Gardens near banks of Khannout River. In 191-72 the Nank Matah damp leaked & flooded the Deoha River. Many people died as the flood has taken place in odd hours. Leaving the 1977 Lok Sabha elections when Md Shamshul Hasan Khan of Sherpur became MP, all MPs were from other districts. Local politicians could not win the Loksabha Elections. Thus politically the district remained backward so was its economic growth.

Pilibhit Tiger Reserve

Pilibhit Tiger Reserve is located in Pilibhit district, Mahof range of Uttar Pradesh state in India. It lies along the India-Nepal border in the foothills of the Himalayas and the plains of the 'terai' in Uttar Pradesh. It is one of India's 50 Project Tiger Tiger reserves.

Pilibhit is one of the few well-forested districts in Uttar Pradesh. According to an estimate of the year 2004, Pilibhit district has over 800 km2 (310 sq mi) forests, constituting roughly 23% of the district's total area. Forests in Pilibhit have at least a good number of tigers and a good prey base for their survival as per records and assumption there were 36 tigers in 2016–17, then counts goes up till 45 in 2017–18, and present August 2019 to November 2020 there are 65 tigers in this reserve and more. Although some illegal human residents are still present in the reserve, the government is aiming to remove them. During winter tigers could easily be seen in the countryside near forest areas. It holds a wide range of different animal and bird species.

Pilibhit forests area is a home for the striped cats, tigers, bears, and many species of birds. A proposal, created in 2005, to make a home for the endangered cats in Pilibhit forests was sent to the government of India in April 2008. Pilibhit Tiger Reserve was declared in September 2008 based on its special type of ecosystem with vast open spaces and sufficient feed for the elegant predators.

Geography of the reserve
The northeastern boundary of the reserve is the Sharda river (Nepali: Mahakali River) which defines the Indo-Nepal border, while the southwest boundary is marked by the River Sharda and the River Ghaghara. The reserve has a core zone area of 602.79 km2 (232.74 sq mi) and a buffer zone area of 127.45 km2 (49.21 sq mi). Elevation ranges from 168 to 175 meters above MSL.

Demographics

According to the 2011 census Pilibhit district has a population of 2,031,007, roughly equal to the nation of Slovenia or the US state of New Mexico. This gives it a ranking of 226th in India (out of a total of 640). Its population growth rate over the decade 2001-2011 was  23.83%. Pilibhit has a sex ratio of 889 females for every 1000 males, and a literacy rate of 63.58%. Scheduled Castes and Scheduled Tribes make up 16.42% and 0.08% of the population respectively.

At the time of the 2011 Census of India, 83.03% of the population in the district spoke Hindi, 8.99% Urdu, 3.72% Punjabi, 3.05% Bengali and 1.13% Bhojpuri as their first language.

Tourist attractions
 Chuka Beach

 Pilibhit Tiger Reserve

 Bifercation 
 Bhiramchari Ghaat

 Gauri Shankar Temple 
 Yashvantri Temple
 Jama Masjid Pilibhit

 Dargah Shahji Mohammad Sher Miya

Transportation

Airport

Bareilly Airport is a nearest airport to Pilibhit Tiger Reserve and Pilibhit and this airport is located around 43 km from Pilibhit.
Bareilly Airport is connected to cities like Mumbai, New Delhi and Bengaluru with direct flights.

Railway Station

 Pilibhit Junction railway station
 Puranpur railway station
 Bisalpur Railway Station
 Bhopatpur Railway Station
 Majhola Railway Station
 Shahi Railway Station

UPSRTC Bus Stand

 Pilibhit UPSRTC Bus Depot
 Puranpur Bus Stand
 Bisalpur Bus Stand
 Amaria Bus Stand

Towns 
Amaria
Barkhera
Bilsanda
Bisalpur
Jahanabad
Kalinagar
Madhotanda
Nyoria Husainpur
Puranpur
Majhola

Notable people
Md Shamsul Hasan Khan
Mukund Lal Agrawal
Hakeem Hafiz Abdul Majeed (Founder of Hamdard (Wakf) Laboratories)
Mohan Swarup
Sanjay Singh Gangwar
Simranjeet Singh (Hockey Player)
Riyaz Ahmad (Ex Minister)
Anis Ahmad Khan
Nalneesh Neel
Peetam Ram
Gopal Krishna Saxena
Agys Ramsaran Verma
Hemraj Verma
Vivek Kumar Verma

Figures about Pilibhit District

Total Area District - 3504 km2
Total Area city - 68.76 km2

Population (as 2011)

References

External links

 
 http://www.tigerreservepilibhit.com

 
Districts of Uttar Pradesh
Minority Concentrated Districts in India